Christian Stockfleth (1639–31 March 1704) was a Norwegian civil servant and diplomat. He was born in Christiania, Norway, a son of bishop Henning Stockfleth, and a nephew of civil servant Hans Stockfleth. Stockfleth studied at the University of Copenhagen, and further in other European cities. He assumed various central positions with the Danish rule in Norway. From 1683 to 1691 he was appointed Envoy to Stockholm. After returning to Norway he held various positions as Diocesan governor and County Governor in Christianssand, Akershus, and Bergen until his retirement in 1704, shortly before his death.

References

1639 births
1704 deaths
Diplomats from Oslo
University of Copenhagen alumni
Civil servants from Oslo
Norwegian people of Danish descent
County governors of Norway